Tanja Chiara Frank (born 24 January 1993) is an Austrian competitive sailor.

She competed at the 2016 Summer Olympics in Rio de Janeiro, in the mixed Nacra 17 where she won a bronze medal. Frank was a flag bearer for Austria during the closing ceremonies along with sailing partner, Thomas Zajac. In 2021, she competed in the 2020 Olympics, finishing 17th.

References

External links
 

1993 births
Living people
Austrian female sailors (sport)
World champions in sailing for Austria
420 class world champions
Olympic sailors of Austria
Olympic bronze medalists for Austria
Olympic medalists in sailing
Sailors at the 2016 Summer Olympics – Nacra 17
Sailors at the 2020 Summer Olympics – 49er FX
Medalists at the 2016 Summer Olympics